A surface marking of clinical importance is Bryant's triangle (or iliofemoral triangle), which is mapped out thus: 
 the hypotenuse of the right angled triangle is a line from the anterior superior iliac spine to the top of the greater trochanter.
 its sides are formed respectively by:
 a vertical line from the anterior superior iliac spine
 a perpendicular line from the top of the greater trochanter.

References

External links
 
 Diagram at gesundheit.de

Skeletal system